Brodd Fotballklubb is a Norwegian football club from Stavanger.

The club was founded on 25 April 1913 as BK Brodd. It participated in competitions for the first time in 1915, and reached the inaugural League of Norway in 1937–38. In 1940 it merged with the former AIF club Arbeidernes TIL and took the name IL Brodd. After the Second World War, the club had sections for football, athletics, boxing, cycling, skiing and handball. Most sports disappeared, with football being left standing, but after 2003 the sports handball, badminton and floorball were added.

15.06.2010 IL Brodd changed their name to Brodd Fotballklubb Stavanger, while handball, badminton and floorball was established as separate sports clubs.

The men's football team currently resides in the Third Division (fourth tier), where its current stint began in 2008.

Both coaches of Viking FK, Morten Christoffer Jensen and Bjarte Lunde Aarsheim have previously been part of the club.

Current squad

Personnel

Technical staff

Administrative staff

Recent seasons
{|class="wikitable"
|-bgcolor="#efefef"
! Season
!
! Pos.
! Pl.
! W
! D
! L
! GS
! GA
! P
!Cup
!Notes
|-
|2008
|3. divisjon
|align=right |11
|align=right|26||align=right|6||align=right|3||align=right|17
|align=right|39||align=right|78||align=right|21
||First round
|
|-
|2009
|3. divisjon
|align=right| 8
|align=right|26||align=right|12||align=right|1||align=right|13
|align=right|49||align=right|58||align=right|37
||Second qualifying round
|
|-
|2010
|3. divisjon
|align=right|8
|align=right|24||align=right|13||align=right|5||align=right|6
|align=right|51||align=right|30||align=right|54
||First round
|
|-
|2011
|3. divisjon
|align=right|4
|align=right|24||align=right|12||align=right|6||align=right|8
|align=right|60||align=right|46||align=right|42
||First round
|
|-
|2012
|3. divisjon
|align=right|6
|align=right|26||align=right|13||align=right|3||align=right|10
|align=right|70||align=right|59||align=right|42
||Second qualifying round
|
|-
|2013
|3. divisjon
|align=right bgcolor="#FFCCCC"| 14
|align=right|26||align=right|7||align=right|2||align=right|17
|align=right|57||align=right|82||align=right|23
||First round
|Relegated
|-
|2014
|4. divisjon
|align=right bgcolor=#DDFFDD| 1
|align=right|22||align=right|16||align=right|3||align=right|3
|align=right|61||align=right|17||align=right|51
||First round
|Promoted
|-
|2015
|3. divisjon
|align=right|11
|align=right|26||align=right|10||align=right|4||align=right|12
|align=right|43||align=right|52||align=right|34
||First round
|
|-
|2016
|3. divisjon
|align=right|4
|align=right|26||align=right|14||align=right|6||align=right|6
|align=right|58||align=right|24||align=right|48
||First qualifying round
|
|-
|2017
|3. divisjon
|align=right|10
|align=right|26||align=right|9||align=right|6||align=right|11
|align=right|47||align=right|53||align=right|33
||First round
|
|-
|2018 
|3. divisjon
|align=right|5
|align=right|26||align=right|13||align=right|4||align=right|9
|align=right|66||align=right|47||align=right|43
||Second qualifying round
|
|-
|2019
|3. divisjon
|align=right| 9
|align=right|26||align=right|9||align=right|5||align=right|12
|align=right|51||align=right|50||align=right|32
||First round
|
|-
|2020
|colspan="11"|Season cancelled
|-
|2021
|3. divisjon
|align=right| 5
|align=right|13||align=right|6||align=right|3||align=right|4
|align=right|15||align=right|19||align=right|21
||First round
|
|-
|2022
|3. divisjon
|align=right| 4
|align=right|26||align=right|14||align=right|2||align=right|10
|align=right|36||align=right|35||align=right|44
||First round
|
|}
Source:

Managerial history

  Gestur Ingvarsson (2003)
  Erik Tangen (2004-2005)
  Ronny Deila (November 2005-january 2006)
  Richard Bjerga (2006-2008)
  Tor Magne Madsen (2008)
  Knut Skeie Solberg &  Arturo Cleveland(2009-2010)
  Erik Løland (2011)
  Endre Tangen (jan - march 2012)
  Ole Fredrik Bergseth (march 2012-2013)
  Rune Larsen & Esben Ertzeid  (2014)
  Bjarte Lunde Aarsheim(2015)
  Kristian Hoem Sørli (2016-2017)
  Antonio Silva (2018)
  Aleksander Midtsian (2019)
  Ali Kilinc (2020–)

References

External links

Official site

Football clubs in Norway
Association football clubs established in 1913
Sport in Stavanger
Defunct athletics clubs in Norway
1913 establishments in Norway